The list of ship launches in 1930 includes a chronological list of notable ships launched in 1930.


References 

Sources
 
 
 

1930
Ship launches